The St Hilary transmitting station is a facility for telecommunications situated close to the village of St Hilary, Glamorgan in the Vale of Glamorgan, Wales, in the UK. It comprises a  guyed mast with antennas attached at various heights. The site was established in 1958 for Independent Television transmission on VHF. Transmissions from the site include FM radio, DAB radio and mobile telephone signals.

It broadcasts Heart Wales on FM and DAB to the large parts of South Wales.

Its broadcast areas include: St. Hilary, Cowbridge, Ystradowen, Miskin, Pontyclun, Bonvilston, St. Nicholas, Swansea, Llanelli, West of Barry, Pontypridd, Caerphilly, Mountain Ash, Llantrisant, Church Village and Talbot Green.

The studios of the regional radio station Nation Radio are located on the site and its DAB transmissions to south-east Wales are made from the mast. Nation Radio also transmits from other sites, including on FM from nearby Wenvoe and from Kilvey Hill near Swansea.

History

Construction
The plan by the Independent Television Authority (ITA) to build a mast at the site was controversial (prompting a House of Lords debate in May 1957).

Transmission
Test transmissions commenced on 2 September 1957 on Band III channel 10 (199.75 MHz) from antennas at 340 m above sea level and the station entered television broadcast service on that frequency in January 1958. The programming was initially provided by TWW.

In 1965, Band III channel 7 (184.75 MHz) was added to the mast, transmitting from an antenna array sited about 20 m below the existing channel 10 array. This was to carry the programmes of the bilingual Teledu Cymru service that were already being provided by TWW in the rest of Wales, which in 1968 was replaced by Harlech Television (HTV Wales). From that point onwards, the channel 10 transmissions carried the English-language "General Service" (again, initially provided by TWW, and from 1968 by HTV). Channel 10's power output was decreased to 55 kW and the Wales-facing antennas were removed, though the power output towards the West of England remained about the same as it had been previously.

In 1985, when 405-line TV closed, the site was re-engineered to remove the VHF television antennas. St. Hilary became just a telecommunications mast and remained so until October 2000 when Real Radio commenced FM Radio broadcasting from the site. In late 2000, DAB Digital Radio was added to the radio broadcasting repertoire initially transmitting the Cardiff & Newport multiplex on channel 11C, but with Swansea SW Wales on channel 12A commencing in February 2004.

In 2006 Ofcom received a proposal for a new Rock-Orientated FM station to transmit from the site, but the licence was awarded to Xfm South Wales, now Nation Radio. Nation's studios are located at the foot of the St Hilary mast, but the station's Cardiff transmitter is a few miles away at Wenvoe.

Services

Analogue television

14 January 1958 - 15 February 1965

15 February 1965 - 3 January 1985

Analogue radio (VHF FM)

October 2000 - May 2014

May 2014 - present day

Digital Radio (DAB)

October 2000 - 31 January 2004

February 2004 - Present

See also
Radio masts and towers
List of tallest buildings and structures in Great Britain

References

External links
MB21's page on 405 TV to Wales and the West
"405 Alive's list of transmitters"
More details on 405-line ITV transmitters

Transmitter sites in Wales
1957 establishments in Wales
Buildings and structures in the Vale of Glamorgan